The Alingar River (also Alingâr) is a river in Laghman Province of eastern Afghanistan.

It is one of the major tributaries of the Kabul River, part of the Indus River basin.  It has two sources, the Ramgel and Kulem rivers.

It gives its name to Alingar District and Alingar Valley. It also flows through Mihtarlam in Mihtarlam District.

See also

References

Rivers of Afghanistan
Kabul River
Landforms of Laghman Province
Valleys of Afghanistan
Rivers of Pakistan